WLIS (1420 AM) is a radio station licensed to serve Old Saybrook, Connecticut. The station is owned by Crossroads Communications of Old Saybrook, LLC. It airs a talk radio–adult standards format. The station is also simulcast on WMRD Middletown, Connecticut.

The station has been assigned the WLIS call letters by the Federal Communications Commission since it was initially licensed.

References

External links
 WLIS official website
 

LIS
Nostalgia radio in the United States
Talk radio stations in the United States
Radio stations established in 1957
1957 establishments in Connecticut